Statistics of Swedish football Division 3 for the 1954–55 season.

League standings

Norra Norrland 1954–55

Mellersta Norrland 1954–55

Södra Norrland 1954–55

Norra Svealand 1954–55

Östra Svealand 1954–55

Västra Svealand 1954–55

Östra Götaland 1954–55

Västra Götaland 1954–55

Södra Götaland 1954–55

Footnotes

References 

Swedish Football Division 3 seasons
3
Swed